Rubén Alfonso Ramírez Enríquez (4 March 1936 – 11 February 2021) was a Guatemalan politician who served as Minister of Education.

References

1936 births
2021 deaths
People from Suchitepéquez Department
Guatemalan journalists
Male journalists
Guatemalan writers
Guatemalan educators
Education ministers of Guatemala